Neil Price may refer to:

 Neil Price (footballer) (born 1964), English retired footballer
 Neil Price (archaeologist), English archaeologist